Thierry Desjardins (born 1 October 1941) is a French reporter and pamphleteer, who works as a journalist for Le Figaro.

Career 
Thierry Desjardins was born 1 October 1941 in the 8th arrondissement of Paris.

Desjardin entered the political service of Le Figaro in 1963, moved to the foreign service in 1966 and became a senior reporter from 1973 to 1981. After a short passage as editor of France-Soir from 1981 to 1983, he returned to Le Figaro as a senior reporter and became deputy editor from 1990 to 1993, and then general deputy director from 1993 to 2000.

Distinctions 
 1975: Albert Londres Prize
 2000: 
 Officier de la Légion d’Honneur
 Officier de l’Ordre national du Mérite.

Bibliography 
1976: Le Martyre du Liban, Plon
1977: La Corse à la dérive, Plon
1981: Sadate, pharaon d'Égypte, Éditions , 
1983: Un inconnu nommé Chirac, La Table ronde
1986: Les chiraquiens, La Table ronde
1994: Pasqua, Édition n° 1
1996: Lettre au Président à propos de l'immigration, et de quelques autres sujets tabous qu'il faudra bien finir par aborder, Fixot
1998: Lettre au président sur les malheurs de la France, Robert Laffont
1998: Le Cancre, Robert Laffont, Prix Louis Barthou of the Académie française 
1999 Le scandale de l'éducation nationale, Robert Laffont, 
2000: Arrêtez d'emmerder les Français, Plon, 
2001: Chirac, réveille-toi, Robert Laffont
2004: Monsieur le président, c'est une révolution qu'il faut faire !, Albin Michel
2006: Nicolas, Laurent, Ségolène, Dominique… Assez ! de mensonges, d'hypocrisie, de promesses, de parlotes, de trahisons, de lâcheté…, JC Lattès, 
2008: Galipettes et cabrioles à l'Élysée, Fayard, 
2009: Sarkozy, ses balivernes et ses fanfaronnades, Fayard

External links 
 Blog de Thierry Desjardins
 Un portrait de Thierry Desjardins
 Thierry Desjardins on Babelio
 La guerre de religion a-t-elle commencé ? on Nuits d'Orient
 Thierry Desjardins on Voyages à la Une
 Thierry Desjardins on the site of the Académie française 

20th-century French journalists
21st-century French journalists
French war correspondents
Albert Londres Prize recipients
Officiers of the Légion d'honneur
Officers of the Ordre national du Mérite
Journalists from Paris
1941 births
Living people
Le Figaro people